Shi Yongxin is the current abbot of the Shaolin Temple. He is the thirteenth successor after Shi Xingzheng. He is the Chairman of the Henan Province Buddhists Association, a representative of the Ninth National People's Congress and also one of the first Chinese monks ever to get an MBA degree.

Biography
Shi Yongxin was born as Liu Yingcheng in Anhui Province's Yingshang County. Shi Yongxin is his Buddhist name. At the request of his parents, he entered monastic life at the age of 16 at Shaolin Monastery, and received full precepts in 1984. At the age of 22, he became the heir-apparent to the abbotship of Shaolin after completing his education at various Buddhist colleges, and a Dharma gathering was held between August 19 and 20, 1999, in the Shaolin Monastery, Songshan, China, for Yongxin to formally take office as abbot. He is the Chairman of the Henan Province Buddhists Association, Vice Chairman of the Buddhist Association of China, a representative of the Ninth National People's Congress. Yongxin's duties are scholarly and ecclesiastic, which involves presiding over large ceremonies at Shaolin.

Criticism
Yongxin has been widely criticized in the online Buddhist and martial arts communities for commercializing the temple and running it like a business, earning him the nickname "CEO Monk". Most of the criticisms involve gifts he has allegedly accepted, such as a special robe worth 160,000 Yuan ($23,439 USD) in 2009 and a Volkswagen Touareg 4x4 worth over 1,000,000 Yuan in 2006. Other criticisms involve him using advertisements for the temple, the way admission fees are charged, and the fees charged to burn incense. Yongxin has also been criticized for his approval of the demolition of nearby environment in 2001, where the village surrounding the Shaolin Temple was bulldozed in order to help the bid for it to become a UNESCO World Heritage Site.

In November 2009 the official Shaolin Temple website was hacked twice. The first time, the message "Shaolin evildoer Shi Yongxin, go to hell" was posted in calligraphy. The second time, hackers posted a letter said to be written by Yongxin in which he apologized for living a materialistic lifestyle and commercializing the temple.

Yongxin has countered these criticisms by claiming that commercialization is just a modern tool to promote and spread traditional Shaolin culture and martial arts, and is good for the Temple in the end. In his view, "Commercialization or industrialization, whatever term you use it, is a path leading up to the truth of Zen. My vision is that Shaolin will eventually become a source of consolidating Chinese people's confidence and wisdom."

As of January, 2011, Yongxin and the temple operated over 40 companies in cities across the world, including London and Berlin, which have purchased land and property.

Prostitution rumor
In May 2011, it was rumored that Abbot Yongxin solicited prostitutes. While Yongxin himself did not comment on the accusations, Qian Daliang, general manager of Shaolin Intangible Assets Management Center, said "it will depreciate ourselves if we make too many explanations." If it is time for the abbot to come out, he will, Qian added. It was also claimed the temple later explained that Yongxin was performing a Buddhist service for the prostitute, rather than having sex with her.

See also
 Chan Buddhism (Zen)

References

External links
 Official website of Shaolin Temple
 Abbot of China Shaolin Temple
 Official website of Bodhidharma Community

People's Republic of China Buddhist monks
Chinese Zen Buddhists
1965 births
Living people
Zen Buddhist abbots
Soto Zen Buddhists
Politicians from Fuyang
People's Republic of China politicians from Anhui
Abbots of Shaolin Temple
Delegates to the 9th National People's Congress
Delegates to the 10th National People's Congress
Delegates to the 11th National People's Congress